Pat Woods may refer to:

 Pat Woods (politician) (born 1948/49), American politician in the New Mexico Senate
 Pat Woods (footballer) (1933–2012), English footballer
 Pat Woods (singer), American singer